Decoradrillia harlequina is a species of sea snail, a marine gastropod mollusc in the family Drilliidae.

Description

Distribution
This species occurs in the shallow waters of the Caribbean Sea, the Greater Antilles, the Lesser Antilles and off the Bahamas.

References

 Fallon P.J. (2016). Taxonomic review of tropical western Atlantic shallow water Drilliidae (Mollusca: Gastropoda: Conoidea) including descriptions of 100 new species. Zootaxa. 4090(1): 1–363

External links

harlequina
Gastropods described in 2016